The Irish Trades Union Congress (ITUC) was a union federation covering the island of Ireland.

History
Until 1894, representatives of Irish trade unions attended the British Trades Union Congress (TUC).  However, many felt that they had little impact on the British body, and the Dublin Trades Council had twice tried and failed to form an Irish federation of trade unions.  Its third attempt, the Irish Trades Union Congress, met for the first time in April 1894.  Although some Irish delegates continued to attend the British TUC, their decision to bar representatives of trades councils from 1895 increased dissatisfaction, and the ITUC soon became the leading Irish union federation.  Despite this, the new federation adopted the form of the British TUC, differentiating itself primarily by offering lower subscription rates and lower costs for delegates to attend its annual congress.  In 1900, the British TUC asked the ITUC to amalgamate with it, but this request was rejected.

In its early years, the ITUC was dominated by small craft unions.  The unions of carpenters were particularly important, while the printers and tailors also proved significant.  Several British-based unions with Irish members also affiliated.  While initially aiming to include the "land and labour" movement, this was excluded from 1898 onwards, as its organisations were not considered to be recognised trade unions or trades councils.  Early issues discussed as the congress included the campaigns for an eight-hour day, for manhood suffrage, and for improvements to pay and conditions.  Calls for nationalisation were initially defeated, but were passed in 1898.  While delegates votes in favour of establishing a political fund, to support favoured candidates, nothing came of this, although the ITUC did have strong links with Joseph Nannetti, who liaised on its behalf with the Irish Parliamentary Party.

In 1912, the ITUC established a political arm, becoming known as the Irish Labour Party and Trade Union Congress (or Irish Trade Union Congress and Labour Party).  The political wing evolved into the Labour Party.  Despite the Partition of Ireland, the ITUC continued to organise throughout the island, but tensions arose between the unions based in Britain and with members in both Britain and Ireland, and the Irish-based unions.  In 1936, the organisation formed a commission to examine the issue.  William O'Brien put in a proposal to form ten industrial groupings with no overlaps to negotiate on behalf of workers - in effect, this would have passed existing union activities to ten industrial unions.  This and three other proposals were discussed at the 1939 conference, but O'Brien and his supporters walked out and formed the Advisory Council of Irish Unions.  This comprised eighteen unions based in Ireland, and accounted for about half the ITUC membership.

The Advisory Council cut ties with the ITUC in 1945 and formed the Congress of Irish Unions.  After long negotiations, the two organisations reunited in 1959 to form the Irish Congress of Trade Unions.

Affiliates
The following unions were affiliated to the ITUC as of 1925:

 Amalgamated Engineering Union
 Amalgamated Society of Locomotive Engineers and Firemen
 Amalgamated Society of Slaters and Tilers
 Amalgamated Society of Tailors and Tailoresses
 Amalgamated Society of Woodcutting Machinists
 Amalgamated Society of Woodworkers
 Amalgamated Transport and General Workers' Union
 Amalgamated Union of Building Trade Workers
 Ancient Guild of Incorporated Brick and Stone Layers
 Associated Blacksmiths' and Ironworkers' Society
 Belfast and Dublin Locomotive Engine Drivers' and Firemen's Trade Union
 Civil Service Clerical Association
 Dublin Operative Plasterers' Trade Society
 Dublin Packing Case Makers
 Dublin Typographical Provident Society
 Flax Roughers' and Yarn Spinners' Trade Union
 Irish Bakers', Confectioners' and Allied Workers' Amalgamated Union
 Irish Clerical and Allied Workers' Union
 Irish Engineering Industrial Union
 Irish Garment Makers' Industrial Union
 Irish Mental Hospital Workers' Union
 Irish Municipal Employees' Trade Union
 Irish National Teachers' Organisation
 Irish National Union of Painters and Decorators
 Irish Post Office Workers' Union
 Irish Transport and General Workers' Union
 Irish Union of Distributive Workers and Clerks
 Irish Women Workers' Union
 National Amalgamated Furnishing Trades Association
 National Amalgamated Society of Operative House and Ship Painters and Decorators
 National Sailors' and Firemen's Union
 National Society of Brushmakers
 National Union of Life Assurance Workers
 National Union of Railwaymen
 National Union of Sheet Metal Workers and Gas Meter Makers of Ireland
 National Union of Vehicle Builders
 Railway Clerks' Association
 Tailors' and Garment Workers' Trade Union
 Typographical Association
 Union of Post Office Workers
 United Operative Plumbers and Domestic Engineers

By 1954, the following unions held membership:

Secretaries
1894: John Simmons
1899: Hugh McManus
1900: E. L. Richardson
1910: P. T. Daly
1918: William O'Brien
1920: Thomas Johnson
1928: Eamonn Lynch
1941: Cathal O'Shannon
1945: Thomas Johnson
1945: Ruaidhri Roberts

Presidents

Treasurers

References

1959 disestablishments in Ireland
National trade union centres of Ireland
1894 establishments in Ireland
Trade unions established in 1894
Trade unions disestablished in 1959